The 2001 Spanish motorcycle Grand Prix was the third round of the 2001 Grand Prix motorcycle racing season. It took place on the weekend of 4–6 May 2001 at the Circuito de Jerez.
In the 500cc race, the 2nd place for Norick Abe was the final podium in his premier class career.

500 cc classification

250 cc classification

125 cc classification

Championship standings after the race (500cc)
Below are the standings for the top five riders and constructors after round three has concluded.

Riders' Championship standings

Constructors' Championship standings

 Note: Only the top five positions are included for both sets of standings.

References

Spanish motorcycle Grand Prix
Spanish
Motorcycle Grand Prix